The Autrey House, now hosting the Autrey House Museum, is a historic house located at the junction of LA 151 and LA 152, about  west of Dubach, Louisiana.

Built in 1849 by Absalom Autrey, the house is a rare example of dog trot house, as less than ten of these houses still remain in Louisiana.

The house was listed on the National Register of Historic Places on October 20, 1980.

The historical building is now hosting the Autrey House Museum, a satellite property of Lincoln Parish Museum & Historical Society, which is located in the enlisted Kidd-Davis House.

See also
 National Register of Historic Places listings in Lincoln Parish, Louisiana
 Kidd-Davis House

References

External links
The Lincoln Parish Museum & Historical Society website

Houses on the National Register of Historic Places in Louisiana
Houses completed in 1849
Dogtrot architecture in Louisiana
Lincoln Parish, Louisiana
National Register of Historic Places in Lincoln Parish, Louisiana